The women's flyweight 51 kg boxing event at the 2015 European Games in Baku was held from 19 to 25 June at the Baku Crystal Hall.

Results

References

External links

Women 51
2015 in women's boxing